Al Thumama or Al Thumamah may refer to:

Al Thumama (Doha), a district in Doha in Qatar
Al Thumama Stadium, in Al Thumama, Qatar
Al Thumamah (Riyadh), an area in northeastern Riyadh, Saudi Arabia